Oix, OIX, or variation, may refer to:

 Open Identity Exchange (OIX), advertising and digital identity provider
 oix, a syllabic encoding from Phofsit Daibuun
 Oix, a Spanish river originating in La Vall de Bianya
 , a former village merged into Montagut i Oix
 Oix, a former name of the municipality of Château-d'Œx
 L'Oix, a former name of the island and commune of Loix
 Oregon-IX (OIX), an internet exchange; see List of Internet exchange points 
 Orion-X (ICAO airline code: OIX), a Russian airline; see List of airlines of Russia

See also

 OLX (disambiguation)
 O9 (disambiguation)